Eduard Evgenievich Martsevich (December 29, 1936, Tbilisi –  October 12, 2013, Moscow) was a Soviet and Russian film and theater actor. People's Artist of the RSFSR.

Biography

Career
He graduated from the Mikhail Schepkin Higher Theatre School (1959). Since 1959 - an actor Mayakovsky Theatre. Since 1969 - an actor Academic Maly Theater of the USSR. Prosperous and fortunate fate Martsevich in the theater world was associated with the name Nikolay Okhlopkov.

At the beginning of his artistic path, he tried his hand at directing. For this year, he broke away from the theater and went to the Lithuanian town of Panevezys for famous director Juozas Miltinis trained profession director.

In 1987, Eduard Martsevich awarded the title of People's Artist of the RSFSR. In 2013 the actor has worked in movies and regularly went to the scene of the State Academic Maly Theater.

Died
From 11 to 30 September 2013 Martsevich was in Botkin Hospital in Moscow, October 1 - in the hospital number 67, and October 2 in serious condition was taken to hospital in an emergency department acute endotoxicosis Sklifosovsky Institute with cirrhosis.

Filmography 

1958: Fathers and Sons as Arkady Kirsanov
1959: Annushka as Vovka
1965-1966: War and Peace as Boris Drubetskoi
1969: The Red Tent as Finn Malmgren
1970: Theft as collector Alexey Burov
1971: Antsyali ardzaganqnere as Heini
1974: I am Looking For My Destiny as father of Alexander
1975: This Alarming Winter as children's doctor Vyacheslav Ogorodnikov
1977: Obelisk as Pavel Miklashevich
1977: Semeynye obstoyatelstva as Nikodim
1979: Starye dolgi as Vadim Gorokhovskiy
1980: Karl Marx. Young Years (TV Series) as Heinrich Heine
1980: Bread, Gold, Nagan as gang leader Arkady Nikolaevich Mezentsev
1980: Ippodrom as Turin
1981: Young Russia as Franz Lefort
1981: The Woman in White as Sir Percival Glyde
1981: An Ideal Husband as Lord Arthur Goring
1982: The Star and Death of Joaquin Murieta as Organ-Grinder
1984: TASS Is Authorized to Declare... (TV Mini-Series) as Dmitry Stepanov, a Soviet journalist
1984: Lets the Charms Last Long as writer
1986: Strange Case of Dr Jekyll and Mr Hyde as Nevile
1991: In the USSR as Boris Fydorovich, music teacher
1991: Red Island as theater director / cardinal
1993: The Bee as counterfeiter recidivist
1994: Maestro Thief as Pyotr Khlynov
2003: A Morning They Woke Up as Professor
2005: The Last Guardian as Kostyrev
2007: Anna Karenina (TV Mini-Series) as Prince Shtcherbatsky
2010: Ivanov as Grigory Shabelski, Uncle Ivanov
2011: Split (TV Series) as Patriarch Joseph of Moscow (uncredited) (final appearance)

Awards 
Honored Artist of the RSFSR (1974)
People's Artist of the RSFSR (1987)
 Order For Services to the Fatherland IV degree (3 September 2006)  for outstanding contribution to the development of domestic theatrical art and many years of fruitful activity
 Order of Friendship (1997)
 Medal In Commemoration of the 850th Anniversary of Moscow

Family 
 Father –  Evgeny Mikhailovich Martsevich (1911-1974). Mother –  Nina Alekseevna Sarankina (1914-1980).
  Wife –  Liliya (born 1952)
 Sons:
 Kirill (born 1974), Chairman of the Council of young professionals theaters in Moscow, the deputy director of the theater under the direction of Dzhigarkhanyan
 Philipp (born 1980), film and theater actor

References

External links

1936 births
2013 deaths
Russian male film actors
Russian male stage actors
Soviet male film actors
Soviet male stage actors
20th-century Russian male actors
21st-century Russian male actors
Soviet theatre directors
Russian theatre directors
People's Artists of the RSFSR
Deaths from cirrhosis
Burials in Troyekurovskoye Cemetery